Novi Sad is the second largest city in Serbia.

Novi Sad may also refer to:
 City municipality of Novi Sad, one of two city municipalities which constitute the city of Novi Sad
 DDOR Novi Sad, company in the city
 FK Novi Sad, football club from the city
 KK Novi Sad, basketball club from the city
 University of Novi Sad, city university
 Novi Sad Airport, airport near the city
 Novi Sad Synagogue, city synagogue
 Novi Sad Theological College, theological college in the city
 Novi Sad Jazz Festival, a jazz festival in the city
 Novi Sad Fair, a fair in the city

Abroad
 Novi Sad Friendship Bridge, a bridge in England, named after the city of Novi Sad
 Novi Sad Al-Wahda, 3x3 basketball club from Abu Dhabi, United Arab Emirates

People
 Thanasis Kaproulias, an audio artist who creates noise music under the name of Novi_sad